The Asa Sanger House is a historic house in Sherborn, Massachusetts. The oldest portion of this -story timber-frame house is, based on architectural evidence, believed to date to the early decades of the 18th century. It has transitional styling, including features of First Period and later Georgian styling. At the time of the American Revolutionary War the house was owned by Asa Sanger, whose family was prominent in town civic and economic affairs.

The house was listed on the National Register of Historic Places in 1986.

See also
 National Register of Historic Places listings in Sherborn, Massachusetts

References

Houses on the National Register of Historic Places in Middlesex County, Massachusetts
Houses in Sherborn, Massachusetts